Nicolás Zurmendi (born 5 October 1966) is an Uruguayan former tennis player.

Zurmendi, a college tennis player at Northwestern State, partnered with Marcelo Filippini to win a gold medal for doubles at the 1986 South American Games. In the same year he was also a Uruguayan representative at the inaugural Goodwill Games, held in Moscow.

In 1990 he made a Davis Cup appearance for Uruguay, playing the doubles rubber in a tie against Peru. He and Daniel Montes de Oca were beaten by Carlos Di Laura and Jaime Yzaga, but Uruguay went on to win the tie.

References

External links
 
 
 

1966 births
Living people
Uruguayan male tennis players
Northwestern State Demons and Lady Demons athletes
Competitors at the 1986 Goodwill Games
Competitors at the 1986 South American Games
South American Games gold medalists for Uruguay
South American Games medalists in tennis
College men's tennis players in the United States
20th-century Uruguayan people